The Aquanauts (later known as Malibu Run) is an American adventure/drama series that aired on CBS in the 1960–1961 season. The series stars Keith Larsen, Jeremy Slate and Ron Ely, who later replaced Larsen on midseason.

Synopsis
The hour-long series focuses on the adventures of two Southern California divers, Drake Andrews (Larsen) and Larry Lahr (Slate), who made their living salvaging sunken wrecks. In January 1961, Larsen left the series due to health problems. His character rejoined the Navy and a new character, Mike Madison (Ron Ely), joined the cast. A month later, the format of the series was also changed with the show's characters, Larry and Mike, opening up a shop in Malibu. No longer encountering underwater dangers, storylines shifted to situations involved on land. To reflect the changes in the format, the series was retitled Malibu Run.

The program was in competition with the short-lived Hong Kong on ABC and NBC's Wagon Train. Unable to compete with NBC's highly rated Wagon Train, the series was canceled after one season.

Cast
 Keith Larsen as Drake Andrews
 Jeremy Slate as Larry Lahr (1960)
 Ron Ely as Mike Madison (1961)
 Charles Thompson as The Captain (1961)

Notable guest stars
Dyan Cannon, Russ Conway, Donna Douglas, Peter Falk, Robert Knapp, Sam Levene, Audrey Meadows, Carroll O'Connor, Susan Oliver, Burt Reynolds, Sue Randall, Inger Stevens, Jane Withers, Keenan Wynn, James Coburn, Jim Davis, Larry Pennell and Ken Curtis, these two last actors, later of Ripcord fame. In the episode  "The Double Adventure" Rue McClanahan makes a small appearance as a waitress in a diner.

Production notes
Produced by Ivan Tors for Ziv-United Artists and the rights to this series are currently held by MGM Television.

Despite its short run, The Aquanauts was popular with the programmers at Buffalo TV station WNYP-TV, who at one point aired the series every day at the same time. Unfortunately, the station inadvertently played the same episode every day for two weeks until someone noticed.

Episodes

Merchandising

The TV show was also adapted into a comic book by Dan Spiegle, distributed by Dell Comics as part of their 4-Color series #1197.

A paperback novel was published dated February 1961 by Popular Library titled "The Aquanauts" by Daniel Bard and featuring Keith Larsen's character Drake Andrews. It is listed on the cover as Popular Giant G516 with a cost of 35 cents.

See also
Aquanauts — 1979 Soviet sci-fi movie

References

External links

Sea Hunt Trivia Guide, The Aquanauts from The Scuba Guy

1960 American television series debuts
1961 American television series endings
Black-and-white American television shows
CBS original programming
American adventure television series
1960s American drama television series
Television series by Ziv Television Programs
Television shows set in California
English-language television shows
Television shows adapted into comics
Television series by United Artists Television